Orly Airport attack may refer to:
1975 Orly Airport attacks
1978 Orly Airport attack
1983 Orly Airport attack
2017 Orly Airport attack